Sir Valentine Browne, 2nd Baronet, of Molahiffe (died 1640), was an Irish landowner and MP.

Birth and origins 
Valentine was born about 1615. He was the eldest son of Sir Valentine Browne and his first wife, Alice FitzGerald. His father was the 1st Baronet Browne of Molahiffe, County Kerry. His mother was a daughter of Gerald FitzGerald, 14th Earl of Desmond, the rebel earl. His mother's family were the FitzGeralds of Desmond, a cadet branch of the Old English Geraldines, of which the FitzGeralds of Kildare were the senior branch.

Baronet 
On 7 September 1633 Browne succeeded his father as the 2nd Baronet Browne of Molahiffe.

Parliament 
When Charles I summoned the Irish Parliament of 1634–1635, Browne stood for Kerry County and was elected. The Lord Deputy of Ireland, Thomas Wentworth (the future Lord Strafford) demanded taxes: six subsidies of £50,000 (equivalent to about £ in ) were passed unanimously. The parliament also belatedly and incompletely ratified the Graces of 1628, in which the King had conceded rights for money.

Marriage and children 
Before 1638 Sir Valentine married Mary MacCarthy, the second daughter of Sir Charles (alias Cormac) MacCarthy, 1st Viscount Muskerry and his first wife Margaret O'Brien. She was a sister of his stepmother, his father's second wife.

Valentine and Mary had four children, two sons:
Valentine (1638–1694), 1st Viscount Kenmare
John of Ardagh (died 1706), married in 1672 Joan, daughter of Edmund Butler and sister of Pierce Butler, 6th Baron Cahir, but died childless.

—and two daughters:
Ellis, married John Tobin of Cumpshinagh, County Tipperary.
Eleanor, married a Mr. Power of Kilmeadon, County Waterford.

Death and timeline 
Sir Valentine died 25 April 1640 and was buried on 6 July 1640 at the church of Killarney. His son succeeded at the age of two and became a ward of his uncle Donough MacCarty, 2nd Viscount Muskerry.

Notes and references

Notes

Citations

Sources 

  (for Ross Castle)
 
  (for Desmond)
  – (for Kenmare)
  – G to K (for Kenmare)
  – S to T (for Strafford)
  – 1611 to 1625 (for Browne)
  – Canonteign to Cutts (for Clancarty)
 
  – (for timeline)
 
 
 
  – Barons (under Aylmer)
  – Parliaments & Biographies (PDF downloadable from given URL)
 

1640 deaths
Year of birth unknown
Baronets in the Baronetage of Ireland
Valentine
Irish MPs 1634–1635
Irish MPs 1639–1649
Members of the Parliament of Ireland (pre-1801) for County Kerry constituencies